The Bærum mosque shooting or Al-Noor Islamic Centre shooting occurred on 10 August 2019 at the Al-Noor Islamic Centre mosque in Bærum, Norway, about  west of the capital city Oslo. A gunman broke in through a locked door and opened fire inside the centre, hitting no one. He was subdued by three men after a scuffle and turned over to police. The stepsister of the suspect was later found dead in their family home. Norwegian authorities indicted him for terrorism and murder.

Shooting 

The suspect reportedly began a Facebook livestream in the hours preceding his attempt, but this was taken down. Before going to the mosque, he allegedly killed his younger stepsister while she slept in her bed, firing three bullets into her head and one into her chest.

The suspect was reportedly wearing a uniform and helmet when he entered the mosque, shooting his way through the locked door. He was carrying two shotguns or "shotgun-like" weapons and a pistol, opening fire in the room, hitting nobody. Prayers had just ended, with only three elders remaining in the mosque. One of the men approached the suspect and pinned him down, moving his weapons away. The two began to struggle, and the suspect poked the man in the left eye. Another of the men in the room then hit the suspect on the head to subdue him. The police were called at 16:07 local time. The suspect was in a chokehold when police arrived at the mosque. He appeared in court two days later, with his face and neck marked by bruises and scratches.

Perpetrator 
Philip Manshaus, a 21-year-old Norwegian man, perpetrated the attack. He lived near the area of the shooting. He was indicted for terrorism and murder. The police have stated that Manshaus is refusing to speak to them, and that he was already known to law enforcement but did not have a criminal background. The national broadcaster NRK spoke with some of his neighbors. One described him as ordinary, saying he had helped her with household tasks before, though another claimed he had not been very happy when he was young, with several neighbors also suggesting that a family bereavement a few years earlier had severely impacted him, and that in the last year he had turned increasingly to religion and extremism. Norwegian police had stated the day after the arrest that they were planning to give the suspect a mental health assessment. In the official questioning session, Manshaus declared that his goal was to intimidate Muslims in Norway. In the weeks before the attack, Manshaus had tried to join the neo-Nazi Nordic Resistance Movement, but for various reasons he never got beyond the first of two planned initiation interviews.

Shortly before the attempt, someone using the name Philip Manshaus was active on a web forum that has been variously reported as 4chan and 8chan, but was confirmed to be a copycat forum called EndChan. His retrieved messages include telling people that "it's my time, i was elected by saint tarrant" , asking those he was messaging to "bump the Race War thread irl", and saying that "Valhalla awaits". Several intermediary messages had been removed. The messages are seen as praising Brenton Tarrant, the perpetrator of the Christchurch mosque shootings in March 2019, and refer to him as "saint tarrant". The Christchurch shootings were inspired by, among other things, the 22/7 attacks that happened in Norway in 2011. The user also posted a meme depicting Tarrant, Patrick Crusius, and John T. Earnest as "chads". All three perpetrated racially and/or religiously motivated gun murders in 2019, including Crusius' attack on a Walmart in El Paso, Texas only a week earlier. Manshaus' posts also reportedly feature him describing himself as the "third disciple"; internet extremism researchers connect this with the rhetoric of Tarrant, suggesting the other 'disciples' would be Earnest and Crusius. Online, Manshaus has also praised Vidkun Quisling, who headed a domestic Nazi collaborationist regime during World War II, and expressed far-right, anti-immigration views.

Victims 
Manshaus' 17-year-old stepsister was found dead in their family home by police. She was born in Jiangxi, China, and adopted at 2 years old by Manshaus' stepmother. Manshaus has been charged with her murder.

The injured man was 65-year-old Mohammad Rafiq. During the scuffle with the suspect, Rafiq overpowered and disarmed him before he could attack anyone else in the mosque.  He received minor injuries while the suspect tried to break free from a chokehold, including an attempt to gouge out Rafiq's left eye.  Rafiq is a Pakistani retired Air Force officer who had been living in Norway for two and a half years and was a frequent visitor to Al-Noor Islamic Center in Bærum.

Response 
Authorities reported that security in Norway may become increased after the attack, as it occurred during the Muslim holiday of Eid al-Adha, with the Prime Minister raising the national security the following day. The Al-Noor Islamic Centre had already added extra security after the Christchurch mosque shootings. According to local Norwegian media, the mosque said that security would be improved again.

The Prime Minister, Erna Solberg, condemned the attack. Solberg and Abid Raja, a Liberal Norwegian politician, spoke together on the day of the attack, assuring the public that places of worship should be safe and calling for plans to break down Islamophobia in the country. Another reaction to the incident was a speech given by Siv Jensen, the leader of the right-wing Progress Party, also referred to Rafiq as a hero. The day after the attack, on the Eid al-Adha celebration day, Solberg and other important figures, as well as the men from the mosque, attended a ceremony in solidarity held in Sandvika.

EndChan has deleted the thread that the user with Manshaus' named posted on, and had its primary web domain taken offline following the attack.

As the shooting spread in media, so did the actions of Rafiq and the other man in the mosque, which a Danish newspaper described as "courageous"; several media outlets, primarily in Norway but also some foreign ones, described Rafiq as a "hero".

A Norwegian philanthropist, Elisabeth Norheim, started a fundraising campaign on a Norwegian crowdfunding website. to help raise money so Rafiq and the other man who helped subdue the attack could undertake the hajj. After the initial goal of 55,000 NOK (~ 6100 USD) for the cost of the two to travel was surpassed, with more than 180,000 NOK (~20,000 USD) raised in one day, the organizers said they could also fund the hajj for the third man in the mosque during the attack. The fund raised was later passed the adjusted goal of 230,000 NOK (~25,000 USD).

On 15 August 2019, a ceremony was held at the Sandvika Police House to praise Rafiq and the other man for their actions. It was hosted by Beate Gangås, the Oslo Police Commander-in-Chief, and Lisbeth Hammer Krogh, the mayor of Bærum.

Investigation and criminal proceedings 
The Norwegian Police Security Service said that they received a tip about Manshaus approximately one year prior to the attack. After coordinating with the local police department, Oslo Police District, they found that the tip was vague and showed no signs of imminent terror planning activities. The tip was not followed up. Norwegian police reported that they have spoken with Manshaus previously because of his online behavior.

On 12 August 2019, in a court hearing in Oslo District Court, Manshaus was put in pre-trial jail for four weeks with no visitation, mail or media access. Manshaus declared himself not guilty and called to be released.

Arrest and charges 
On 17 February 2020, Norwegian prosecutors formally charged Manshaus with murder and terror.

On 7 May 2020, the suspect appeared in court again where he denied the charges.

On 11 June 2020, Manshaus was found guilty of murder and terrorism and sentenced to 21 years in prison along with a provision that he should be imprisoned indefinitely if determined to be a threat to society.

Communication issues 
It has been reported that when the members of the mosque called the police, the incident was initially classified as low-priority and the police would not respond; the men struggled trying to convey the situation to the operator.

There have also been claims that a user of an online forum had tried to notify the Norwegian police three times that he suspected an attack would happen, but that local police told him to call the FBI. Police say they are aware of this allegation, but that they are not aware of any such call.

See also
 List of right-wing terrorist attacks
 Kongsberg attack
 Christchurch mosque shootings
 Poway synagogue shooting
 2019 El Paso shooting
 Halle synagogue shooting
 Bayonne mosque shooting

Notes

References 

2019 in Norway
Anti-Chinese violence
Anti-Muslim violence in Europe
Attacks on mosques
August 2019 crimes in Europe
Mosque shooting
Failed terrorist attempts in Norway
Islam in Norway
Neo-Nazism in Norway
Persecution of Muslims
Terrorist incidents in Europe in 2019
Neo-fascist terrorist incidents